Christopher Robert Cheney  (20 December 1906 – 19 June 1987) was a medieval historian, noted for his work on the medieval English church and the relations of the papacy with England, particularly in the age of Pope Innocent III.

Life
Cheney was born on 20 December 1906 in Banbury, Oxfordshire, to parents George Gardner Cheney and Christina Stapleton Bateman. He was educated at Banbury County School and Wadham College, Oxford, where he graduated with first-class honours in 1928.

He lectured at the University of Cairo, University College, London (1931–1933), and the University of Manchester (1933–1937) before returning to the Oxford in 1937 as reader in diplomatic and fellow of Magdalen College in 1937. He married Mary Hall on 24 August 1940.

After war service with MI5, he took the chair in Medieval History at Manchester in 1945 until his election as the Professor of Medieval History at the University of Cambridge in 1955. He remained at Cambridge as a fellow of Corpus Christi College until his retirement in 1972.

Cheney was elected a Fellow of the British Academy in 1951 and appointed CBE in 1984. He died in Cambridge on 19 June 1987.

Publications
 [revised edition 1983]

 [and many later editions]

with W. H. Semple (eds) 

with F. M. Powicke (eds) 

with B. E. A. Jones (eds) 
with Eric John (eds)

References

Works cited

1906 births
1987 deaths
People from Banbury
British medievalists
Alumni of Wadham College, Oxford
Academics of the Victoria University of Manchester
Fellows of Magdalen College, Oxford
Fellows of Corpus Christi College, Cambridge
Professors of Medieval History (Cambridge)
Fellows of the British Academy
Academics of University College London
20th-century British historians
English palaeographers
Commanders of the Order of the British Empire
Corresponding Fellows of the Medieval Academy of America
Chetham Society
Lancashire Parish Register Society